Médée was a French frégate du deuxième ordre, or 26-gun frigate, built in 1740. She is widely considered to be the inspiration for a long line of similar sailing frigates, and was the first ship captured by the British Royal Navy in the War of the Austrian Succession. She became a privateer and was wrecked at St Ives, Cornwall, following a succession of gales in November 1745.

Construction
Médée was designed by Blaise Ollivier, with twenty-six 8-pounder guns, and was launched in February 1741 at Brest. She is regarded as the first of the 'true' frigate designs: she was built with two decks, but only the upper deck mounted guns. These guns were relatively heavy, and the higher mounting meant that they could be used in rough seas.

Capture and final voyage
She was sold in March 1745, becoming the privateer Boscawen; named after Edward Boscawen, the captain of Dreadnought. Although the Navy Board had the opportunity to purchase her, they decided not to retain her, in spite of her innovative design qualities; many French ships of the time were not designed for durability and she was not as strongly built as British frigates of that time. Despite this the number of guns she carried was increased, and when Boscawen encountered a series of gales after leaving the Azores on 5 October 1745 she sprung several leaks. She was further weakened when, through negligence, the mainyard parted and dropped onto the ship, straining the already weakened hull. In response to a near-mutinous crew, Commodore George Walker set a course for the Lizard and having been swept northwards she was a floating wreck when Land's End was sighted on 24 November. The ship finally hove to in St Ives Bay on the north Cornish coast. Her anchors had been ditched days before and she broke in two on rocks at St Ives with the townsfolk wading into the sea to save the crew. Only four crew were lost, Commodore Walker being the last man to leave the wreck.

Her speed and size provided the Bedford Board of Admiralty with the arguments needed to change British frigate design.

References

1741 ships
Sailing frigates of the French Navy
Age of Sail frigates of France
Ships built in France
Captured ships
Frigates of the Royal Navy
Maritime incidents in 1745
Cornish shipwrecks
St Ives, Cornwall